CFHQS J2329-0301 is a quasar discovered in 2007 by the Canada-France-Hawaii High-z Quasar Survey (CHFQS) using the Canada-France-Hawaii Telescope. Until the discovery of ULAS J1120+0641 in June 2011, it was the farthest known quasar with a light travel distance of about 12.7 billion light years from Earth. Because it is very bright, its light can be used to determine the properties of the gas in front of it. The black hole powering the quasar is thought to have about 500 million solar masses.

References

See also
List of the most distant astronomical objects

Quasars
Pisces (constellation)
Astronomical objects discovered in 2007